Aleix García Serrano (born 28 June 1997) is a Spanish professional footballer who plays as a central midfielder for La Liga club Girona.

Club career

Villarreal
Born in Ulldecona, Tarragona, Catalonia, García joined Villarreal CF's youth setup in 2005, aged eight, after starting out at CF Ulldecona. He made his senior debut with the reserves in Segunda División B on 26 April 2014 at only 16 years of age, coming on as a late substitute in a 1–0 away win against CF Badalona.

García featured for the C team in the 2014–15 season, also appearing for the B side in the same campaign. He made his first team – and La Liga – debut on 23 May 2015, replacing Antonio Rukavina in a 4–0 loss at Athletic Bilbao.

Manchester City
On 27 August 2015, García joined Premier League side Manchester City. He was selected by then-City manager Manuel Pellegrini against Chelsea on 21 February 2016 in the fifth round of the FA Cup.

García made his first Premier League appearance on 17 September 2016, coming on as a 75th-minute substitute in a 4–0 home win against Bournemouth. On 21 September, he started in an EFL Cup match against Swansea City, scoring his first goal for the club in the 2–1 away win. He next started a month later on 26 October, in another EFL Cup match, a 1–0 loss to Manchester United.

Girona (loan)
On 1 August 2017, García was loaned to newly promoted La Liga club Girona FC until the end of the season. He was loaned again for the 2018–19 season.

Royal Excel Mouscron (loan)
García was loaned to Belgian side Royal Excel Mouscron for the 2019–20 season.

Dinamo București & Eibar
On 8 October 2020, he signed a contract with Romanian club Dinamo București, until the end of the season. On 18 January 2021, after featuring sparingly, he returned to Spain and its top tier after signing for Eibar on a free transfer.

Return to Girona
On 23 July 2021, García returned to Girona on a two-year contract, with the club now in Segunda División. He made his return debut for the club on 14 August, the first matchday of the 2021–22 season, starting in a 2–0 victory against Amorebieta. On 2 December 2021, García scored his first goal for the club upon returning, closing the score in a 5–1 away win in the Copa del Rey over fourth tier Calvo Sotelo Puertollano. He made 45 total appearances for the club in his first season, helping the club reach promotion to La Liga in the play-offs.

On 26 February 2023, García opened the score in a historic 3–2 La Liga win over Athletic Bilbao, Girona's first ever win away against Bilbao at San Mamés.

Career statistics

Notes

References

External links

Profile at the Girona FC website

1997 births
Living people
People from Montsià
Sportspeople from the Province of Tarragona
Spanish footballers
Footballers from Catalonia
Association football midfielders
La Liga players
Segunda División B players
Tercera División players
Premier League players
Belgian Pro League players
Liga I players
Villarreal CF B players
Villarreal CF players
Manchester City F.C. players
Girona FC players
Royal Excel Mouscron players
FC Dinamo București players
SD Eibar footballers
Spain youth international footballers
Spain under-21 international footballers
Spanish expatriate footballers
Expatriate footballers in Belgium
Expatriate footballers in England
Expatriate footballers in Romania
Spanish expatriate sportspeople in Belgium
Spanish expatriate sportspeople in England
Spanish expatriate sportspeople in Romania
Catalonia international footballers